"Save It for a Rainy Day" is a song written by Andrew Dorff, Matthew Ramsey and Brad Tursi, and recorded by American country music artist Kenny Chesney. It was released in June 2015 as the fourth and final single from Chesney’s 2014 album The Big Revival.

Critical reception
The song received a positive review from Taste of Country, who wrote that "So many of the songs on The Big Revival recall memories of Chesney’s biggest hits without feeling like duplicates. Add “Save It for a Rainy Day” to the list. As he reaches for a fourth straight No. 1 it’s difficult to argue this isn’t his best album since Just Who I Am: Poets & Pirates."

Music video
The music video was directed by Shaun Silva and premiered in July 2015.

Chart performance
The song has sold 259,000 copies in the US as of November 2015.

Year-end charts

Certifications

References

2014 songs
2015 singles
Kenny Chesney songs
Columbia Nashville Records singles
Songs written by Andrew Dorff
Songs written by Matthew Ramsey
Song recordings produced by Buddy Cannon
Music videos directed by Shaun Silva
Songs written by Brad Tursi
Columbia Records singles